The Ion Aircraft Ion is a two-seat, twin boom, pusher configuration light aircraft based on the DreamWings Valkyrie.  It was still in development in 2010 but is intended either for homebuilding from kits or flyaway production, with versions meeting US and European rules.

By November 2020 production had not started and the company was for sale. Geode Capital Management completed the acquisition of Ion Aircraft on 10 September 2021. The company is now called Gaea Capital Management.

Design and development

The Ion Aircraft Ion is a development of the DreamWings Valkyrie, a twin boom, pusher configuration ultralight aircraft which flew for the first time in  1999. The Valkyrie generated considerable interest and many potential customers, but DreamWings became bankrupt in 2001.  The project was later restarted by a customer group under the name of Ion Aircraft and the part-built prototype of the Ion was displayed at Oshkosh in July 2005, though the first "hops" were not made until July 2007. 
Whilst the Valkyrie and the Ion share the share twin boom, single pusher engine, mid-wing layout, have tricycle undercarriages and seat two in tandem, they differ significantly.   In particular the Valkyrie's strongly swept and tapered fins, combined with a trailing low set horizontal tail, which extended beyond the booms, have been replaced with swept, parallel chord fins with a constant chord tailplane linking their upper tips.  Unlike the Valkyrie, the Ion does not have a canard.

Much of the Ion is made of composite materials; the fuselage pod, the wing centre section within the booms, the booms themselves and the empennage are all formed from carbon fiber/epoxy pre-pregs. Outboard of the booms the wings are of bonded aluminium.  The wings carry plain piano hinged ailerons.  The engine cover is GRP.  The cockpit has a single piece canopy, shaped to allow the rear seat to be 8.5 in (220 mm) above the forward one, giving its occupant better vision. The prototype has fixed, aluminium cantilever spring main undercarriage legs and has been flown with and without wheel fairings.  The mainwheels have hydraulic brakes and the nosewheel castors.
 
Several options are to be offered, including a 3 ft 6 in (1050 mm) shorter span wing which will raise the cruising speed by 25 mph (41 km/h; 22 kn) but also increase the stall speed by 32%, a retractable undercarriage and a ballistic recovery parachute.  Kits will be offered to meet either US Light-Sport Aircraft (LSA) rules or European microlight regulations but flyaway aircraft will be built to LSA rules.  Other engines, such as Rotax variants in the 100-115 hp (75-86 kW) power range may be fitted.

In the two years after its first flight in 2007, the Ion prototype flew about 60 hours, some with a Jabiru 3300 six cylinder engine which experienced cooling problems but from May 2009 with a 100 hp (75 kW) Rotax 912ULS flat four engine. In 2010 it appeared at AirVenture, Oshkosh under its own power with a ventral air intake and a new three blade propeller.  The second prototype was under construction but not registered in mid-2011.  The Ion will not be offered for sale until flight tests are completed.

By November 2020 the company was up for sale with the principals indicating that, while they had developed the aircraft they lacked expertise in starting production. They indicated that they wished to sell the company rather than let the project die. Geode Capital Management purchased Ion Aircraft on 10 September 2021. The company is now called Gaea Capital Management.

Proposed variants

Ion 100
Kit, LSA rules, fixed undercarriage.
Ion 105
Kit, US Experimental amateur built rules, retractable undercarriage, short span wings.
Ion 110
Kit, for European rules.
Ion 105
Kit, European microlight rules.
Ion 120
Flyaway, LSA rules.

Specifications (LSA, Rotax 912ULS, estimated performance)

References

External links

2000s United States sport aircraft
Single-engined pusher aircraft
Twin-boom aircraft